= István Gilicz =

Hungarian footballer

Personal information
- Date of birth: 20 August 1934
- Date of death: 16 December 1993 (aged 59)

International career
Years	Team	Apps	(Gls)
1957–1959	Hungary	3	(0)

István Gilicz (20 August 1934 – 16 December 1993) was a Hungarian footballer. He played in three matches for the Hungary national football team from 1957 to 1959.
